Hachimantai may refer to:

Places:

 Hachimantai, Iwate, a city in Iwate prefecture, Japan
 Mount Hachimantai, a mountain in northern Japan
 Hachimantai Station, a railway station in the city of Hachimantai
 Towada-Hachimantai National Park, a Japanese national park

See also